Las Apariencias engañan (Appearances can be deceiving in English) is a 1958 Argentinean romantic comedy film directed by Carlos Rinaldi and written by Carlos A. Petit, based on the novel by Rafael Maluenda.

Cast
 Perla Alvarado
 Ana Arneodo
 Alberto Bello
 Cristina Berys
 Patricia Castell
 Benito Cibrián
 Florindo Ferrario
 Enrique García Satur
 Amadeo Novoa
 Adolfo Stray

References

External links
 

1958 films
Argentine black-and-white films
1950s Spanish-language films
Films directed by Carlos Rinaldi
Argentine romantic comedy films
1950s Argentine films